Arthur Joseph Sleith (22 December 1917 – 17 December 2008) was an Australian rules footballer who played for the Carlton Football Club in the Victorian Football League (VFL).

Notes

External links 

Arthur Sleith's profile at Blueseum

1917 births
2008 deaths
Carlton Football Club players
Australian rules footballers from Victoria (Australia)
Preston Football Club (VFA) players